Sheyakha(h) or shiyakhah is an Arabic language term for the fourth-layer of subdivisions of Egypt.

References

Arabic words and phrases